Young Corbett II (October 4, 1880 – April 10, 1927; born William H. Rothwell) was an American boxer who held the World Featherweight championship. He took the name "Young Corbett II" in honor of James J. Corbett, a heavyweight champion.
Corbett was posthumously inducted into the Ring Magazine Hall of Fame in 1965 and the International Boxing Hall of Fame in 2010.

Pro career

World featherweight champion
Corbett became a professional boxer in 1896 and was undefeated in his first 13 fights with a record of 9-0-3-1. In 1901, Corbett defeated George Dixon for the Western featherweight title in Denver, Colorado. In his next fight, Corbett faced world featherweight champion Terry McGovern in Hartford, Connecticut. Corbett knocked out McGovern in the second round and took the title. He defended the title four times, including a rematch against McGovern, which Corbett also won by knockout. During this time he also engaged in a number of non-title matches, including one against Young Erne and two against Jimmy Briggs, both of which Corbett won.

Attempts to match British World Featherweight Champion Ben Jordan with Young Corbett were not successful.

During this time there is some dispute as to Corbett's claim on the featherweight title. Corbett had trouble making the featherweight limit of 126 pounds, and some sources claim he relinquished his title and moved to the lightweight division in December 1902. Abe Attell then claimed the featherweight title. Other sources show that Corbett defended his featherweight title at weights above 126 pounds with Attell defending the title at 126 pounds.

Later career
Regardless, Corbett continued to fight. He met future world champion Battling Nelson in two consecutive fights in 1904 and 1905, losing both by technical knockout. He then met old nemesis Young Erne in two more fights in Philadelphia, Pennsylvania. The first fight they fought to a draw. The second fight Corbett lost by decision.

He had a mixed record over the five years remaining in his career. Aurelio Herrera knocked him out in 1906, Harlem Tommy Murphy defeated him via decision, but he defeated Young Erne by decision in 1907. His last professional fight was in 1910, though he fought exhibition matches up until his death in 1927.

Corbett died suddenly in April 1927, dropping dead outside the State Theatre in Denver. His death  was attributed to heart disease as he had complained of chest pains to his friends in the week prior to his death.

Professional boxing record
All information in this section is derived from BoxRec, unless otherwise stated.

Official record

All newspaper decisions are officially regarded as "no decision" bouts and are not counted in the win/loss/draw column.

Unofficial record

Record with the inclusion of newspaper decisions in the win/loss/draw column.

References

External links
 
 

Boxers from Denver
Featherweight boxers
World boxing champions
1880 births
1927 deaths
American male boxers